Death Unlimited (with Faux Cyrillic and Capitals: DEДTH UИLІMITED) is the third full-length studio album by the Finnish melodic death metal band Norther. It was released on 3 March 2004 through Spinefarm Records. The Japanese release of Death Unlimited and the Spreading Death CD single features a cover song, "Tornado of Souls" by Megadeth. The song; "Death Unlimited" is featured on the Spreading Death CD single and its video on the DVD single.

Track listing

Videography
The album features a video for the song "Death Unlimited".

Credits

Band
 Petri Lindroos − Harsh Vocals and Guitar
 Kristian Ranta − Guitar and Clean Vocals
 Toni Hallio − Drums
 Jukka Koskinen − Bass
 Tuomas Planman − Keyboards and Synthesizers

Production and other
 Engineered by Anssi Kippo, assisted by T. Auvinen.
 Arranged by Norther and Anssi Kippo.
 Intro and instrumental produced and recorded by Kristian Ranta and Tuomas Planman.
 Guitars and keyboards on "Tornado of Souls" produced by Norther.
 All acoustic guitars by Kristian Ranta.
 Mixed in November 2003 at Finnvox Studios by Mikko Karmila.
 Mastered in November 2003 at Finnvox Studios by Mika Jussila.
 Design by Miikka Tikka.
 Photos by Riku Isohella.
 Shout choir on "Deep Inside", "Death Unlimited", "Hollow" and "Tornado of Souls" by Pete, Jukkis, Kride, Tunkki and Vesseli.

External links
 Official Norther Site
 Album Info on Norther Fansite

References

Norther albums
2004 albums